Stepan Zakharchuk (born November 30, 1986) is a Russian professional ice hockey defenceman who currently plays for HC Dynamo Pardubice of the Czech Extraliga (ELH). He has formerly played most notably with HC Lada Togliatti and Ak Bars Kazan. He is known for his physical play and does not play a creative game and does not score many goals. 

After starting the 2018–19 season with original club, HC CSK VVS Samara of the second tier Supreme Hockey League (VHL), Zakharchuk returned to the KHL in agreeing to a one-year contract with Admiral Vladivostok on October 4, 2018. 

In the 2019–20 season, he captained HC Neftekhimik Nizhnekamsk, collecting 12 points in 41 games, before leaving mid-season to join Czech outfit HC Dynamo Pardubice of the ELH, on 25 January 2020.

His younger brother Ivan also played in the KHL (for HC Sochi, Severstal Cherepovets and alongside Stepan for a brief period at Torpedo Nizhny Novgorod.)

References

External links

1986 births
Living people
Admiral Vladivostok players
Ak Bars Kazan players
HC CSK VVS Samara players
HC Dynamo Pardubice players
HC Lada Togliatti players
HC Neftekhimik Nizhnekamsk players
Neftyanik Almetyevsk players
Russian ice hockey defencemen
Torpedo Nizhny Novgorod players
Sportspeople from Nenets Autonomous Okrug
Russian expatriate ice hockey people
Russian expatriate sportspeople in the Czech Republic
Expatriate ice hockey players in the Czech Republic
Rytíři Kladno players